The Munich Waldfriedhof is one of 29 cemeteries of Munich in Bavaria, Germany. It is one of the larger and more famous burial sites of the city, known for its park-like design and tombs of notable personalities. The Waldfriedhof is considered the first woodland cemetery.

Description
The Munich Waldfriedhof is located in the southwest and borders several city districts today. It is separated in two sections, the old part and the new part (Alter Teil und Neuer Teil). It holds almost 60,000 graves. The Waldfriedhof is open every day from 8am and closes between 5pm and 8pm depending on the season. During the warmer months of the year the city arranges guided tours. The cemetery is connected to the public transport system MVV by several bus lines. Access to the graves by car is very limited. The cemetery borders the beginning Autobahn A95 in the south as well as other large roads in the north and east.

History
The Münchner Waldfriedhof as it is called in German was planned by the architect Hans Grässel and opened in 1907. From 1963 to 1966 the cemetery was enlarged by the architect Prof. Ludwig Römer. 

The cemetery is one of a series of cemeteries in Munich planned by Grässel at about the same timepoint. The leaders of the city had not been fond of the idea of one huge main cemetery when the old burial sites became too small. Thus Grässel was instructed to plan four new cemeteries, one in each cardinal direction. 
The Waldfriedhof was created at a time when most cemeteries were designed as city parks or recreational parks. Typical themes of such cemeteries were "the City of the Dead" or "the Paradise Garden". As the new cemeteries were mostly located in the outskirts of cities rather than in churchyards, and the importance of the church was diminishing, they were relatively profane in character. To regain some symbolic strength, Grässel used influences from early Christian and Byzantine architecture in his funeral chapels and other buildings on the cemetery. He also put the burial chapel in the forest, rather than displaying it at the side of the avenue. Grässel kept the trees growing in the area, letting the woods cover tombs in order to create a feeling of connection between nature and death rather than letting the individual monuments be the main feature of the cemetery.

The themes and ideas from the Munich Waldfriedhof became popular in Germany in the upcoming decades and were used in several similar Waldfriedhöfe (woodland cemeteries) elsewhere. The Munich Waldfriedhof was also a very important predecessor of Skogskyrkogården outside Stockholm, a UNESCO World Heritage Site.

Selection of interred people

Notable burials include:

 Hans Ritter von Adam, World War I flying ace
 Stepan Bandera, Ukrainian politician

 Günther Blumentritt, officer in World Wars I and II
 Michael Ende, author (e.g. The Neverending Story)
 Alfons Goppel, Prime Minister of Bavaria
 Emmy Göring and her daughter Edda Göring, the second wife of Hermann Göring and his daughter
 Hans Grässel, architect
 Jakob Grimminger, Nazi Party & SS standard-bearer of the "Blutfahne" (The Bloodbanner)
 Paul Hausser,  SS-Oberst-Gruppenführer und Generaloberst der Waffen-SS 
 Werner Heisenberg, scientist and Nobel prize winner
 Barbara Henneberger, alpine skier
 Paul Heyse, writer and Nobel prize winner
 Kurt Huber, University Professor and member of the White Rose group
 Friedrich Hund, physicist
 Sabine Impekoven, actress 
 Josef Kammhuber, Airforce General
 Carl Krone, founder of the Circus Krone
 Carl von Linde, engineer and inventor
 Wilhelm List, World War II field marshal
 Leo Peukert, actor 
 Rob Pilatus, model, dancer and singer; member of the musical duo Milli Vanilli containing member Fabrice Morvan.
 Leni Riefenstahl, film director
 Josef Rodenstock, optician and founder of the Rodenstock GmbH
 Dietrich von Saucken, World War II General
 Yaroslav Stetsko, Ukrainian politician
 Franz Stuck, Art Nouveau painter
 Alfred von Tirpitz, World War I admiral
 Frank Wedekind, playwright
 Fritz Wunderlich, German lyric tenor
 Eduard Zorn, World War II General
 Dr. Rudolf Rauch, Physicist, Director of Energy Program Indonesia/ASEAN.

References

 Official Homepage of the Waldfriedhof 
 Constant, Caroline, 1994: The Woodland Cemetery (chapter 1). Byggförlaget 1994, 

Cemeteries in Munich
Protected areas of Bavaria
Tourist attractions in Munich
Parks and open spaces in Munich